The Battle of Paso de Cuevas was fought on 12 August 1865 during the Paraguayan invasion of the Argentine province of Corrientes.

Following losses after the Battle of Riachuelo, and running the gauntlet set up by José María Bruguez at Bella Vista in the Battle of Paso de Mercedes the day before, the allied fleet advanced down the River Paraná, not wanting to be cut off from its supply base. However, the pass at Cuevas was once again manned by 3,000 of Bruguez's men with 34 guns. Barroso suffered 24 dead and 42 wounded.

This was the last operation of naval combat of the Argentine Navy at war with foreign nations prior to the Falklands War.

References

Bibliography
 </ref>

Further reading
 Da Silva, Theotonio Meirelles (2008). Historia Naval Brazileira (in Portuguese). BiblioBazaar, LLC.

External links

Sitio oficial de la Armada de la República Argentina (ARA).  
Historia y Arqueología Marítima  
Maniobras y términos navales  
Navios de Guerra, in naval.com.br   
Official site of the Brazilian Navy 
La Artillería Paraguaya en la Guerra contra la Triple Alianza.

Gallery

1865 in Argentina
August 1865 events
Battles involving Paraguay
Battles involving Argentina
Conflicts in 1865
Naval battles of the Paraguayan War